Shalva Khujadze is a retired Georgian professional football player.

His younger brother Irakli Khujadze also played football professionally.

External links
 
 
 

Living people
Footballers from Georgia (country)
Expatriate footballers from Georgia (country)
Expatriate footballers in Ukraine
Expatriate sportspeople from Georgia (country) in Ukraine
Expatriate footballers in Greece
FC Nyva Ternopil players
FC Dinamo Tbilisi players
Georgia (country) international footballers
FC Dinamo Batumi players
Ukrainian Premier League players
Association football midfielders
1975 births